Glendermott Cricket Club is a cricket club in Derry, Northern Ireland, playing in the North West Championship.

Honours
North West Senior Cup: 1
2005

References

External links

Sport in Derry (city)
Cricket clubs in County Londonderry
North West Senior League members
1926 establishments in Northern Ireland
Cricket clubs in Northern Ireland